Jonathan Andrew Kestenbaum, Baron Kestenbaum (born 5 August 1959) is the British chief operating officer of investment trust RIT Capital Partners plc, and a Labour member of the House of Lords. He is a great-grandson of Joseph Breuer, and a great-great-great-grandson of Samson Raphael Hirsch and of Eliezer Liepman Philip Prins. He is a former Chief Executive of the innovation foundation the National Endowment for Science, Technology and the Arts (NESTA). He was founding Chief Executive of the non-profit "action tank" The Portland Trust. Kestenbaum was created a life peer in  2011 as Baron Kestenbaum of Foxcote in the County of Somerset, and sits on the Labour benches. In 2013, Kestenbaum was installed as Chancellor of Plymouth University. He represented Great Britain at football in the 2001 Maccabiah Games in Israel.

Early life and education

Kestenbaum was born in Tokyo, Japan, and is British. Both his parents' families fled Nazi Germany – first to the United States, then Japan. The family moved to the UK in 1964 when he was five years old.

Kestenbaum is a great-grandson of Joseph Breuer, and a great-great-great-grandson of Samson Raphael Hirsch and of Eliezer Liepman Philip Prins.

Kestenbaum graduated from the London School of Economics where he read Economics and Anthropology, and then pursued postgraduate study at Cambridge University in the Department of Anthropology. He completed an MA in Education at The Hebrew University of Jerusalem, and was subsequently awarded a research scholarship in Education at the Hebrew University. On his return to the UK, Kestenbaum earned an MBA with distinction from the Cass Business School. He is a graduate of the Cabinet Office Top Management Programme and a graduate of the Strategic Agility Programme at Harvard Business School. He has an Honorary Doctorate in Technology from the University of Plymouth, and is an Honorary Fellow of the Royal College of Art.

In 2001, Kestenbaum represented Great Britain at football in the (16th) 2001 Maccabiah Games in Israel. The Maccabiah Games, an international Jewish and Israeli multi-sport event now held quadrennially in Israel, is the third-largest international sporting tournament in the world after the Olympics and the Asian Games. In 2009, he returned to the 2009 Maccabiah Games as the Manager of the Great Britain open football team.
 Kestenbaum and senior coach Les Reed took the Great Britain side to the silver medal, becoming the first British team to reach the football final at the tournament for over 50 years. Kestenbaum also helped Hendon United A win back-to-back titles, including the Maccabi GB Southern Football League Premier Division in their first season. He was also named Maccabi League manager of the year. He is an Honorary Life President of Maccabi GB.

Career

Before becoming active in business, he started his career in education, building an international training programme for young educators.

Subsequently, Kestenbaum was Chief Executive of the Office of the Chief Rabbi, Lord Sacks, and then Chief Executive of the charity the  United Jewish Israel Appeal (UJIA). Following a restructure which involved a merger with another UK charity, the UJIA won the National Charity Award. He has also worked as Chief of Staff to Sir Ronald Cohen, the Chairman of private equity firm Apax Partners, and was founding Chief Executive of non-profit "action tank" The Portland Trust.

In 2005 he became Chief Executive of the innovation foundation National Endowment for Science, Technology and the Arts (NESTA). Whilst at NESTA he highlighted the importance of innovation to economic growth and was an advocate for UK technology start-ups.

In 2010 he was appointed Chairman of Five Arrows Ltd, and subsequently became chief operating officer of the investment trust RIT Capital Partners.

Kestenbaum has served in a number of non-executive roles. He was on the Board of the charity the Design Council and Enterprise Insight, and was Non-Executive Chairman of Quest, a large accounting business. He served on the Governing Body of the innovation agency the Technology Strategy Board, acted as a Commissioner of the Manchester Independent Economic Review and also Chairman of the City of Manchester Science Review. He has completed his term of office on the Innovation Advisory Group at Imperial College and is now Adjunct Professor at the Imperial College Business School. He also served on the Board of the Royal Shakespeare Company, and was involved in developing the new Royal Shakespeare Theatre in Stratford-Upon-Avon.

He chairs the board of directors of The Capital Holdings Funds (EDR Group), as well as serving on the Board of Windmill Hill Asset Management. He was a member of the Board of Profero, a digital marketing company. In January 2014 Profero was sold to Lowe, a subsidiary of Interpublic Group (IPG). Kestenbaum has served on the boards of the Jewish Community Centre London, of London Maccabi, and of Finchley Synagogue.

In December 2013, Kestenbaum was installed as Chancellor of Plymouth University.

House of Lords
Kestenbaum was created a life peer on 24 January 2011 as Baron Kestenbaum of Foxcote in the County of Somerset. He was introduced in the House of Lords on 26 January 2011, and sits on the Labour benches.

See also
List of barons in the peerages of Britain and Ireland
List of chancellors and vice-chancellors of British universities
List of members of the House of Lords

References

1959 births
Academics of Imperial College London
Academics of the University of Plymouth
Alumni of Bayes Business School
Alumni of the London School of Economics
Alumni of the University of Cambridge
Apax Partners
Businesspeople from Tokyo
Competitors at the 2001 Maccabiah Games
Harvard Business School alumni
Jewish footballers
Jewish British philanthropists
Living people
Labour Party (UK) life peers
Life peers created by Elizabeth II
Maccabiah Games footballers
Maccabiah Games competitors for Great Britain
English financial businesspeople
English Jews
Jewish British politicians
Philanthropists from London
School of Education at the Hebrew University of Jerusalem alumni
20th-century English businesspeople
21st-century English businesspeople